Ronnie Buckley (born 15 June 1986) is an Australian male discus thrower, who won an individual gold medal at the Youth World Championships.

References

External links

1986 births
Living people
Australian male discus throwers
21st-century Australian people